Fabrizia is an Italian feminine given name. It is the name of:

Fabrizia Baduel Glorioso (1927–2017), Italian politician
Fabrizia Mealli (born 1966), Italian statistician
Fabrizia D'Ottavio (born 1985), Italian gymnast
Fabrizia Pons (born 1955), Italian rally driver
Fabrizia Ramondino (1936–2008), Italian writer
Fabrizia Sacchi (born 1971), Italian actress

Italian feminine given names